Telecommunications in Somaliland, an internationally unrecognised republic claimed by Somalia, are mainly concentrated in the private sector. A number of local telecommunications firms operate in the region, including Golis Telecom Somalia, SomCable, Somtel and Telesom.

There are other companies that are growing in Somaliland which were launched in 2022 like soltelco

Operators

Golis Telecom Somalia
Bosaso is home to Golis Telecom Somalia, the largest telecommunications operator in northeastern Somalia. Founded in 2002 with the objective of supplying the country with GSM mobile services, fixed line and internet services, it has an extensive network that covers all of the nation's major cities and more than 40 districts in both Somaliland and Puntland.

SomCable
In 2010, SomCable Ltd announced that it was contracted to pull submarine cable from Djibouti port to Berbera. SomCable invested over $100 million USD to complete the project which employed more than 10,000 locals workers. Funding for the project came from local businessman Mohamed Said MSG. The project will ensure that high speed wireless technology capable of delivering sufficient scalable bandwidth to residents of Somaliland is available at the site. The initiative is completed in September 2014.  Somaliland is currently the only Fiber operator in the country.  As of October 2014, SomCable Launched the first LTE solution in Somaliland,  the first GEPON/ FTTP solution in Somaliland.

Somtel
In 2008, Dahabshiil acquired a majority stake in Somtel, a Somaliland-based telecommunications firm specialising in Slow[Somtel], mobile Internet, and mobile phone services. The acquisition provided Dahabshiil with the necessary platform for a subsequent expansion into mobile banking, a growth industry in the regional banking sector.

Telesom
Telesom was established in 2001 to provide telecommunications services in the region. Telesom currently controls 88% of Somaliland scribers, with the remaining 18% shared between the remaining operators. The firm provides a variety of mobile communication products and services including prepaid call plans, monthly subscription plans, international roaming, SMS, WAP (over both GSM and GPRS), residential fixed line services, internet access as well as prepaid and postpaid G subscription services.

NationLink 
NationLink Telecom is present in Somaliland and was one of the first telecom companies in Somaliland as a result of purchasing STC (first telecom company in Somaliland). IN 2010, a foreign investor was brought in with the intent of expanding throughout the region. However, after accusations of mismanagement and expensive equipment sent to sister company in Mogadishu, the investor left and the company ceased trading in Somaliland. The company was sold to Amal Bank in 2019

Regulation
On 13 June 2011, the House of Elders passed the law, without any amendments, on an overwhelming majority of 75 for, 1 against and none abstaining.  On 5 July 2011, the President signed the law which is now in force. The bill was passed following consultations between government representatives and communications, academic and civil society stakeholders. According to the Ministry of Information, Posts and Telecommunications, the Act is expected to create an environment conducive to investment and the certainty it provides will encourage further infrastructural development, resulting in more efficient service delivery.

Satellite technology
Satellite technology is playing an instrumental role in Somaliland. Based on 2002 prices, a VSAT-based asymmetrical 128/64 connection in any given location in Somaliland costs $0.058 per minute. This assumes the connection is used 24 hours per day; seven days per week. The connection, and the associated costs, may be shared by several PCs to lower the “per minute charge” per PC. One tele-centre exampled in Somaliland showed the rate per PC to be $0.005 per minute.

See also

 Telephone numbers in Somaliland

References

External links
Golis
SomCable
Somtel
Telesom

 
Telecommunications in Somalia